Q'orianka Waira Qoiana Kilcher (born February 11, 1990) is an American actress, singer, and activist. Her best known film roles are Pocahontas in Terrence Malick's 2005 film The New World, and Kaʻiulani in Princess Kaiulani (2009). In 2020 she starred in a recurring role on the Paramount Network show Yellowstone.

Early life
Kilcher was born in Schweigmatt, Baden-Württemberg, West Germany. Her name Q'orianka means "Golden Eagle" in Quechua. Her father is of Quechua–Huachipaeri background from Peru, while her mother, Saskia Kilcher, is an American human rights activist of Swiss-German origin. When Kilcher was two, she and her mother moved to Kapaʻa, Hawaii, US, where her brother Kainoa was born.

Her father, from whom she is estranged, was absent for much of her life. Growing up in Hawaii, Kilcher was inspired by the local culture and started hula dancing at the age of five. She also trained in Tahitian dance and West African, as well as ballet, hip hop and modern dance. In 1997, Kilcher won Ballet Hawaii's Young Choreographer Award at age seven.

She was selected to compete at the international Tahitian Dance Competition in San Jose, California, in 1996 and 1997.  She performed in over fifty professional dance performances island wide. As a member of the Waikiki Singers, she was chosen to be the soprano soloist, performing Schubert's Mass in G and Amahl and the Night Visitors by Gian Carlo Menotti. At the age of six years, Kilcher was the first child to study classical voice at the University of Hawaii with Laurance Paxton. She also studied drama with Bill Ogilvie at the Diamond Head Theater.  When she was six, her mother booked her at venues as a featured singer and opening act to some of Hawaii's greats, such as Willie K (Kahaiali'i) among others.

In 1999, her mother moved the family to California. Kilcher started to sing and dance for tourist donations, busking on the Third Street Promenade in Santa Monica.

Career
At the age of ten, Kilcher was cast as Choire Who in Ron Howard's How the Grinch Stole Christmas. She was 12 when she received a full scholarship to the Musician's Institute in Hollywood, where she studied vocal performance, music theory and songwriting.

She also studied martial arts and stunts: she is an accomplished black belt in Wushu kung fu and a stunt performer and has trained at the National Wushu Training Center and Impact Stunts.

At age 15, Q'orianka portrayed Pocahontas in the Academy Award-nominated motion picture The New World (2005), directed by Terrence Malick. Her performance was critically acclaimed and won her the National Board of Review's best breakthrough performance of 2006, the 2006 Alma Award for best Latin American actress in a feature film, and numerous other award nominations. The film was released in December 2005. The film was a critical success, receiving several positive reviews and award nominations, but it was shown in only 811 theatres worldwide. It yielded a relatively low box office gross.

In the summer of 2006, Kilcher began filming the independent film The Power of Few, which she produced through her own production company, Entertainment On-Q. She played the title role in the 2009 feature film Princess Kaiulani. The film, about the overthrow of the Hawaiian monarchy, was released in May 2010 to negative reviews. But Kilcher received positive feedback for her role, with Roger Ebert writing that "she evokes great depth and sympathy in her role and seems to have created Kaiulani from the inside out."

In 2009, Kilcher performed in The People Speak, a documentary feature film that uses dramatic and musical performances of the letters, diaries, and speeches of common people in the U.S., based on historian Howard Zinn's "A People's History of the United States".

A year later, she played Pinti in the family drama Shouting Secrets. The film won Best Film at the 36th American Indian Film Festival in San Francisco, and Kilcher was nominated for Best Supporting Actress. She also portrayed Kerrianne Larkin, daughter of Chibs Telford and Fiona Larkin, in the television series Sons of Anarchy.

In 2011, Kilcher played Tiger Lily in Neverland, a version of the Peter Pan story that aired on the Syfy Channel.

In 2012, Kilcher starred in Firelight alongside Cuba Gooding Jr. and played the role of Caroline Magabo, a young Latina inmate who finds a new lease on life by becoming a volunteer firefighter along with other female juvenile delinquents. In 2013, she portrayed Rayen in Running Deer, an award-winning short film produced and directed by Brent Ryan Green through Toy Gun Films.

Kilcher starred as the Chickasaw Nation representative and actress Te Ata in the 2017 film Te Ata.

In 2018, Kilcher appeared in TNT’s The Alienist as Mary Palmer. Kilcher appeared in the 2019 adventure film Dora and the Lost City of Gold as the Inca princess. In 2022, Kilcher appeared in Channing Tatum's directorial debut, Dog, as Niki, the estranged wife of Tatum's character. Kilcher will produce and star in the upcoming film Yesteryear alongside Scott Haze, Wes Studi and Nick Cassavetes.

Activism
Kilcher has made a commitment to human rights and environmental activism. She speaks on behalf of causes to achieve what she regards as environmental justice and basic human rights. Traveling frequently to speak at youth events, colleges and universities, she has been a featured keynote speaker for organizations such as Amnesty International, the International Forum on Globalization, Amazon Watch IFIP and the United Nations panel discussions titled "Indigenous Peoples: Human Rights, Dignity and Development with Identity", in collaboration with the Declaration on the Rights of Indigenous Peoples.

She lends her celebrity, voice, and energy as spokeswoman, collaborator, and supporter to several international and national NGOs and organizations, such as youth ambassador for Amnesty International (Global Youth Ambassador for Woman's Rights), AIDESEP (spokesperson and voice), Interethnic Association for the Development of the Peruvian Rainforest Federations, the Community School for the Arts foundation (volunteer/spokesperson) and Thursdays Child (youth counselor) Turning The Tides (volunteer/spokesperson), Save Americas Forests, IDEM (South Dakota Youth Project) and is a spokesperson for the American Literacy Campaign.

Working with the National Endowment For the Arts on their "The Big Read" campaign, she will record a book review. Kilcher has read Howard Zinn's The People Speak in staged readings. She joined the cast for the first People Speak film series.

Kilcher recently launched her own youth-driven human rights and environmental organization "On-q Initiative", to connect young Hollywood with youth activist leaders and projects from around the world in support of environmental sustainability, corporate accountability, and basic human rights. Through her production company, IQ-Films, Kilcher is producing several cause-driven documentaries and youth-programming projects.

On June 11, 2009, she visited Lima to support indigenous peoples' rights in the Amazon in Bagua, Peru. In 2007, Kilcher won the Brower Youth Award, an environmental award, for her work in persuading Occidental Petroleum to withdraw from the Peruvian Amazon valley. She also received the Young Hollywood Green Award.

On June 1, 2010, Kilcher and her mother were arrested after Kilcher chained herself to the gates in front of the White House in Washington, D.C. while her mother poured black paint on her to signify oil. They were protesting President Obama's meeting with Peruvian President Alan García, accusing the latter of selling land in the Amazon rainforest to corporations while suppressing indigenous protests. Both were charged with disorderly conduct. The charges were dropped on June 6, 2011, after the two completed community service.

On September 4, 2015, Kilcher was part of a group that sang "Love Song to the Earth". The song aims at raising awareness of climate change, with all proceeds benefiting Friends of the Earth U.S. and the UN Foundation. She and several "Love Song" singers performed in Washington, D.C. before Pope Francis' address to the U.S. Congress.

Personal life
Q'orianka has two brothers, Kainoa and Xihuaru Kilcher, both of whom work as actors and stunt performers. Her first cousin once removed is Jewel, the singer.

Her mother Saskia Kilcher is the daughter of Ray "Pirate" Genet, a Swiss-born mountaineer who later immigrated to the United States, and Wurtilla Dora "Wurzy" Kilcher, who was born in Alaska to Swiss immigrant parents. Q'orianka's great-grandfather was Yule F. Kilcher; he was elected as a member of the Alaska Senate and served as a delegate to the Alaskan constitutional conference.

Fraud charges
In 2018, Kilcher sustained a severe injury to her neck and shoulder during filming of Dora and the Lost City of Gold. She received disability benefits from the insurance company after being treated for her injuries by third-party doctors. In May 2022, Kilcher was charged with alleged workers' compensation fraud after an investigation found that she had filmed scenes for the television series Yellowstone before receiving disability benefits. She pled not guilty at her arraignment in May. Variety reported that she was due to appear in court on August 7, 2022. In February 2023, all charges were dropped.<ref>{{cite web |last1=Trainham |first1=Emily |date=10 February 2023 |url=https://www.foxnews.com/entertainment/yellowstone-actress-qorianka-kilcher-cleared-insurance-fraud-charges |title=Yellowstone' actress Q'orianka Kilcher cleared of insurance fraud charges' |access-date=13 February 2023 |website=Fox News |language=en}}</ref>

Filmography
Film

Television

Awards and nominations

References

External links

About.com interview (December 25, 2005)

Q’orianka Kilcher on Climate Change Activism - video report by Democracy Now!''

1990 births
Living people
American street performers
American child actresses
American film actresses
American humanitarians
Women humanitarians
American people of Peruvian descent
American people of Quechua descent
American people of Swiss-German descent
Indigenous actors of the Americas
Actresses from Hawaii
People from Greater Los Angeles
People from Honolulu County, Hawaii
People charged with fraud
American stunt performers
Hispanic and Latino American actresses
20th-century American actresses
21st-century American actresses
21st-century American singers
21st-century American women singers